Little Ladies of the Night is a 1977 American made-for-television drama film starring David Soul, Louis Gossett Jr. and Linda Purl. When it was broadcast, it became the highest-rated TV movie of all time.

Cast
David Soul as Lyle York
Louis Gossett Jr. as Russ Garfield
Linda Purl as Hailey Atkins
Clifton Davis as Comfort
Carolyn Jones as Marilyn Atkins
Paul Burke as Frank Atkins
Lana Wood as Maureen
Kathleen Quinlan as Karen Brodwick
Vic Tayback as Finch
Katherine Helmond as Miss Colby
Dorothy Malone as Maggie
Bibi Osterwald as Matron

Production
The film was one of a series of TV movies about teen prostitutes which followed Taxi Driver, another being Dawn: Portrait of a Teenage Runaway.

Reception
The Los Angeles Times thought it had "wavering credibility". It was the highest-rated program of its night, with a 36.9 rating and 53 share, seen by 26,270,000 households. ABC claimed this made it the highest-rated TV movie of all time as it surpassed the 36.5 average rating for Helter Skelter (although the second part of Helter Skelter had a higher rating of 37.5). The rating for a made-for-TV movie was only bettered by 1983's The Day After.

At the time of its broadcast, it was the twelfth-highest-rated movie to air on network television.

References

External links
 
 

1977 television films
1977 films
1977 drama films
ABC network original films
Films about child prostitution
Films directed by Marvin J. Chomsky
Films produced by Aaron Spelling
Films about prostitution in the United States
American drama television films
1970s American films